The 2008 Pan American Individual Event Artistic Gymnastics Championships were held in Rosario, Argentina, November 19–23, 2008.

Medalists

Medal table

References

2008 in gymnastics
Pan American Gymnastics Championships
2008 in Argentine sport
International gymnastics competitions hosted by Argentina
Sport in Rosario, Santa Fe